The Edwin Trump House is a single-family home located at 801 South East Street in Fenton, Michigan. It was listed on the National Register of Historic Places in 1982.

History
Edwin Trump was the President of the Trump & Wilmot Bank. He built this house in 1867, reportedly as part of a contest between Trump and his partner, George Wilmot, to see who could build the most lavish home. In 1872, Trump traded the house to local attorney A. U. Wood for a business block in downtown Fenton.

Description
The Edwin Trump House is a two-story, wood-framed Gothic Revival structure built in a T-shape with multiple gables and dormers. It has a decorative open porch, containing Gothic ornamentation in its bargeboards, which match the bargeboards in the eaves of the gables.

References

		
National Register of Historic Places in Genesee County, Michigan
Gothic Revival architecture in Michigan
Houses completed in 1867